The Lettermen are an American male pop vocal trio. The Lettermen's trademark is close-harmony pop songs with light arrangements. The group started in 1959. They have had two Top 10 singles (both No. 7), 16 Top 10 singles on the Adult Contemporary chart (including one No. 1), 32 consecutive Billboard chart albums, 11 gold records, and five Grammy nominations.

History
In 1958, the stage revue Newcomers of 1928 was produced, a nostalgia act which starred 1920s stars Paul Whiteman, Buster Keaton, Rudy Vallée, Harry Richman, and Fifi D'Orsay. The show required three male singers to impersonate The Rhythm Boys, the vocal group that traveled with Whiteman and his orchestra in the late 1920s, and gave Bing Crosby his initial fame. The three singers selected were Mike Barnett, Dick Stewart, and Tony Butala. Jackie Barnett, who was chief comedy writer for the Jimmy Durante TV show, had auditioned the singers, and he decided to name the group "The Lettermen" for the show. Newcomers of 1928 opened on February 28, 1958, at the Desert Inn in Las Vegas, Nevada. They played to sell-out audiences and were held over for many weeks. Continuing with a six-week tryout at the Deauville Hotel in Miami Beach, Florida, the idea continued to be a smash. Barnett and Russell were replaced midway through the run by Gary Clarke and Jerry Paul. When the show ended, Butala landed a job as singer/bass player in a lounge group, "Bill Norvis and the Upstarts", along with Clarke. After a few months, Clarke left the group and was replaced by Jim Pike (November 6, 1936 – June 9, 2019). Pike and Butala decided to leave the Upstarts and form a new group, although they had not yet decided on a name. Pike envisioned a group where each member was an excellent soloist as well as a great group singer. Pike and Butala joined with Bob Engemann (February 19, 1935 – January 20, 2013), a singer that Pike had met when he attended Brigham Young University a few years earlier. (Pike and Engemann had come to Los Angeles, California, and had sung together until Engemann had to go into the California National Guard for 6 months. That's why Pike joined Bill Norvis and there met Butala.) The combination of Pike, Engemann and Butala first recorded in 1960.

They secured a recording contract with Warner Bros. Records through Bob Engemann's older brother, Karl Engemann, who was a record producer there, and for whom Pike had earlier released a record called Lucy D, which was not successful. Karl Engemann years later became Marie Osmond's personal manager for many years. Pike, Butala, and Engemann as "The Lettermen" released two singles in 1960 for Warner Bros. The A-sides were "Two Hearts" and "Their Hearts Were Full of Spring". They were not successful. After Warner Bros., Karl Engemann moved on to Capitol Records as President of A&R. He got them out of their contract at Warner Bros. and made an appointment for them to see Nick Venet, a producer at Capitol. The audition was successful in getting them another record contract.

There was another "Lettermen" group in the late 1950s and early 1960s that recorded for Liberty Records (which was a major record label at the time), an R&B group with five members, and their not-so-successful single was called "Hey Big Brain". About that same time, there was a third group called the Lettermen Trio, headed up by Sammy Vandenburg, who also had no record success. But the "Lettermen" of Pike, Engemann, and Butala had the first hit record, so, by law, they were entitled to use the "Lettermen" name exclusively.

The Lettermen were unknown until they signed with Capitol Records in 1961. Their first single for Capitol, "The Way You Look Tonight," succeeded on the Billboard Hot 100 pop chart and climbed to No. 13. Their next, "When I Fall in Love," reached the Top 10 in late 1962 and hit No. 1 on AC. They had several other Top 10 AC hits, such as 1965's "Theme From A Summer Place". In late 1967, Bob Engemann resigned and was replaced by Jim Pike's younger brother, Gary Pike. The hits continued with the 1967 medley "Goin' Out of My Head"/"Can't Take My Eyes Off You" and in 1968 with "Put Your Head on My Shoulder", plus 1969's "Hurt So Bad", which reached No. 12 and lasted 21 weeks on the Hot 100, second only to the 22 weeks for The Archies' "Sugar, Sugar" within that calendar year. The last successful single was in 1971, John Lennon's "Love", a solo by Jim Pike.

The Lettermen have had two Top 10 singles (both No. 7), 16 Top 10 Adult Contemporary singles, including one Adult Contemporary No. 1, 32 consecutive Billboard Hot 200 charted albums, 11 gold records, five Grammy nominations, an Andy Award, and a Cleo Award.

The Lettermen were featured on the TV show Dobie Gillis in the episode "Vocal Boy Makes Good" which originally aired on January 16, 1963.
The Lettermen were featured on The Jack Benny Program in the episode "The Lettermen" which originally aired on March 31, 1964. {S14 Ep25}
In 1976, Jim Pike left the group because of vocal problems and sold the Lettermen name to Butala. After Gary Pike left the Lettermen in 1981, the Pike brothers along with Ric de Azevedo sang The Lettermen hits, billed as "Reunion".
 
In 1961, The Lettermen started performing live concerts, doing over 200 shows a year, an unbroken string that continues to the present.

Over the decades, the group has had various line-ups, replacing members who left for various reasons with new people to maintain a trio. Tony Butala has stated that the group ethos is that of three strong soloists that harmonize, and that the group encourages individual singing and songwriting. Butala has stated that the combination of himself, Donovan Tea (thirty-eight years) and Bobby Poynton (sixteen years) "is the best combination of voices, and best sounding group since the original trio." Butala also said this of the previous line-up of himself, Tea, and Mark Preston (eleven years) thus highlighting the high standard of vocalists The Lettermen had always had. This is also evident in the addition of Rob Gulack to the group in 2019 as Butala eased into retirement.

Among their many songs include renditions of several traditional Filipino kundimans such as Dahil sa Iyo ("Because of You"), Sapagkat Kami Ay Tao Lamang ("For We Are Only Human"). Their enunciation and pronunciation in the language has developed over the decades that they have interpreted these love songs.

In 1969, in light of The Doors' singer Jim Morrison's arrest in Miami for indecent exposure, the Lettermen performed at a concert against indecency, along with Anita Bryant, Kate Smith, and Jackie Gleason. President Nixon supported the concert. (Source: Rock Almanac, 1983) The Lettermen had covered songs by the Doors in 1968.

On December 9 and 10, 2012, The Lettermen Society Convention was held at the Soaring Eagle Casino & Resort in Mount Pleasant, Michigan. The members had dinner and breakfast with the current group of Tony Butala, Donovan Tea, and Bobby Poynton. They attended the soundcheck and Lettermen Holiday Show with ticketed audience members in the casino showroom. This celebration was the 31st annual convention.

The 32nd annual Lettermen convention was a four-day event at the South Point Hotel, Casino & Spa in Las Vegas between October 10 and October 13, 2013. Hundreds of Lettermen Society members and fans were invited to attend.

Bob Engemann died on January 20, 2013, in Provo, Utah, at age 77, of complications from his December 13, 2012, heart bypass surgery.

Jim Pike died from complications of Parkinson's disease on June 9, 2019, at his home in Prescott, Arizona. He was 82.

Personnel

Current members
 Tony Butala – second tenor 
 Donovan Tea – baritone 
 Bobby Poynton – first tenor 
 Rob Gulack – second tenor 

Past members
 Jim Pike – first tenor 
 Bob Engemann – baritone 
 Gary Pike – baritone & first tenor
 Doug Curran – first tenor 
 Donny Pike – first tenor 
 Ralph "Chad" Nichols – baritone 
 Don Campeau – first tenor 
 David "Red" Saber – baritone 
 Harrison "Harry" Clewley – first tenor 
 Mark Preston – first tenor 
 Ernie Pontiere – first tenor 
 Paul Walters – baritone 
 Darren Dowler – first tenor

Timeline

Awards and recognition
2001: Inducted into the Vocal Group Hall of Fame
2011: Inducted into the "Fans' Entertainment Hall of Fame" - Las Vegas, NV
2012: Inducted into the Hit Parade Hall of Fame
2020: inducted into the Hollywood Walk of Fame

Discography

Albums
{{Columns-list|colwidth=30em|

1962: A Song for Young Love (US No. 6)
1962: Once Upon a Time (No. 30)
1962: Jim, Tony and Bob (No. 59)
1963: College Standards (No. 65)
1963: In Concert (No. 76)
1964: A Lettermen Kind of Love (No. 31)
1964: Look at Love (No. 94)
1964: She Cried (No. 41)
1965: You'll Never Walk Alone (No. 73)
1965: Portrait of My Love (No. 27)
1965: The Hit Sounds of The Lettermen (No. 13)
1966: More Hit Sounds of The Lettermen (No. 57)
1966: A New Song for Young Love (No. 52)
1966: For Christmas This Year (re-released 1975 and again in 1990)(No. 41)
1967: Warm (No. 58)
1967: Spring! (No. 31)
1967: The Lettermen!! ...And Live! (No. 10)
1968: Goin' Out of My Head (No. 13)
1968: Special Request (No. 82)
1968: Put Your Head on My Shoulder (No. 43)
1969: Hurt So Bad (No. 17)
1969: I Have Dreamed (No. 74)
1970: Traces/Memories (No. 42)
1970: Reflections (No. 134)
1971: Everything's Good About You (No. 119)
1971: Feelings (No. 192)
1971: Love Book (No. 88)
1972: Lettermen 1 (No. 136)
1972: Live in Japan
1972: Spin Away
1972: A Time for Us
1973: Alive Again ...Naturally (No. 193)
1974: Now and Forever
1975: There Is No Greater Love
1975: ''Make a Time for Lovin1975: The Time Is Right
1975: Lettermen Live in Japan, 1975
1976: Kind of Country
1977: To a Friend
1979: Love Is...
1979: Lettermen Live with New Japan Philharmonic 
1985: Evergreen
1986: Why I Love Her (re-released 1993 and 2006)
1987: It Feels Like Christmas (re-released 1992 on CD & Cassette Tape and again as reissue version of the 1987 album on September 3, 2013 on CD {from MVD Records} and again in 2014 as CD {along with 4 bonus tracks} {from Capitol Records/EMI under the RCA label})
1991: "Then & Now"
1991: Close to You
1991: Live in Concert
1991: The Lettermen... Then & Now
1992: "Best Hits"
1992: Sing We Noel
1993: Love Is All
1993: "At The Movies"
1995: Christmas with The Lettermen
1995: Deck the Halls
2000: Greatest Movie Hits
2001: Today
2006: Live in the Philippines
2006: Why I Love Her
2008: The Lettermen: Best of Broadway
2008: The Lettermen: Favorites
2010: The Lettermen: New Directions 2010
2014: The Lettermen: It Feels Like Christmas – Special Edition (Along with 4 bonus tracks) (An reissued version of the 1987 album)
2014: The Lettermen: It Feels Like Christmas – Deluxe Edition (Along with 6 bonus tracks) (Target Exclusive only) (An reissued of the 1987 album)
2014: The Lettermen: Christmas Classic Collection (13 Tracks including Christmas All Alone, It Feels Like Christmas and 11 more tracks)
2015: The Lettermen: The Classic Christmas Album (15 Tracks)
2016: The Lettermen: Golden Classic Christmas (16 Tracks) (re-released in Fall 2018 as CD from Capitol Records under the label RCA and MVD Records)}}

Compilations
1966: The Best of The Lettermen (re-released 1988 on CD/Capitol)(No. 17)
1969: The Best of The Lettermen, Volume 21969: Close Up (No. 90) (Released 7/16/1969) 
1970: The Lettermen (3-LP set)
1971: Let It Be Me/And I Love Her1973: Best Now (CD: Capitol/Japan)
1974: Sings Old Rock'n Roll 
1974: All-Time Greatest Hits (No. 186)
1975: The Lovin' Touch of The Lettermen1977: With Love from The Lettermen1988: Twin Best Now1989: When I Fall in Love1990: Best Now (CD: Capitol/Japan)
1990: Greatest Hits – 10 Best Series1992: Collectors Series1993: Best Hits1993: 36 All-Time Greatest Hits1994: Their Greatest Hits & Finest Performances1997: Super Now1998: Memories: The Very Best of The Lettermen2002: A Song for Young Love/Once Once Upon a Time2003: Soft Rock Collection2003: Greatest Hits: The Priceless Collection2003: The Lettermen Collection: Beautiful Harmony (6-CD set:Japan)
2004: Absolutely the Best2006: Complete Hits2007: Complete Hits Volume Two2010: Lettermen Best 
2014: The First Four Albums And More''

SinglesFootnotes:'''
1 "Son of Old Rivers," a parody of "Old Rivers" by Walter Brennan, was recorded by Engemann and Pike.
2 "Turn Around, Look at Me," the b-side of "How Is Julie?," did not chart on the Hot 100, but hit No. 105 on the Bubbling Under Hot 100 Singles chart.
3 "Again" did not chart on the Hot 100, but hit No. 120 on the Bubbling Under chart.
4 "Heartache Oh Heartache" did not chart on the Hot 100, but hit No. 122 on the Bubbling Under chart.
5 "Allentown Jail" did not chart on the Hot 100, but hit No. 123 on the Bubbling Under chart.
6 "Put Away Your Tear Drops" did not chart on the Hot 100, but hit No. 132 on the Bubbling Under chart.
7 "Girl With a Little Tin Heart" did not chart on the Hot 100, but hit No. 135 on the Bubbling Under chart.
8 "Sweet September" did not chart on the Hot 100, but hit No. 114 on the Bubbling Under chart.
9 "Chanson D'Amour" did not chart on the Hot 100, but hit No. 112 on the Bubbling Under chart.
10 "All the Grey Haired Men" did not chart on the Hot 100, but hit No. 109 on the Bubbling Under chart.
11 "I Have Dreamed" did not chart on the Hot 100, but hit No. 129 on the Bubbling Under chart.
12 "Hey Girl" did not chart on the Hot 100, but hit No. 104 on the Bubbling Under chart.
13 The 1976 release of "The Way You Look Tonight" was a new disco version.

See also
List of vocal groups
Boy band
Traditional pop music

References

External links
 
 
 'The Lettermen' Vocal Group Hall of Fame Page
 

Latter Day Saints from Arizona
American musical trios
American pop music groups
American vocal groups
Capitol Records artists
Liberty Records artists
Traditional pop music singers
Musical groups established in 1959
1959 establishments in Arizona